|-
!align=center style=background:pink | Seniors
|-
(Alberta)
(Ontario)
(Quebec)
(Canada West)
(Canada East)
(Canada East)
(Canada West)

|-

|-
!align=center style=background:pink | Juniors
|-
(Canada East)
(Canada East)
(Canada West)
|-

|-
!align=center style=background:pink | Juniors
|-

The Canada national ringette team (popularly known as Team Canada) is the ringette team representing Canada internationally. Canada has both a senior national team, Team Canada Senior, and a junior national team, Team Canada Junior. Both national teams compete in the World Ringette Championships (WRC) and are overseen by Ringette Canada which is a member of the International Ringette Federation (IRF). Team members are selected from the National Ringette League. Team Canada and Team Finland have emerged as ringette's major international rivals at both the senior and junior level.

Canada's first appearance in international ringette began at the inaugural World Ringette Championships in 1990, when Canada sent six different regional teams from across the country to represent the nation. It wasn't until the 1996 World Ringette Championships that Canada finally established its first unified national ringette team. It was the first time only one team represented the nation in international ringette competition. The next time Canada competed was at the 1998 Summit Series where both Team Canada Senior and Team Finland Senior competed exclusively in a European tour.

The 2009 World Junior Ringette Championships marked the first time an international competition took place specifically for junior players between ringette playing nations. The junior tournament merged with the World Ringette Championships senior tournament in 2013 during the sport's 50th anniversary and was the same year Canada created its first all-junior national ringette team.

Early history
Canada was initially represented by six different amateur ringette teams at the inaugural World Ringette Championships in 1990 which took place in Gloucester, Ontario, Canada. In 1996, Canada's national ringette team became the first single representative Canadian team for ringette internationally, forming roughly 20 years after the death of Sam Jacks in 1975, the Canadian identified as the sport's inventor.

Until 2009, Canada only had world representation in ringette at the senior level due to the fact that it was the only level available for elite international ringette competition. Canada created two teams which formed in 2009 for the inaugural World Junior Ringette Championships in the Czech Republic, but Canada wouldn't form its first, single representative all-junior national team until 2013.

World Championship record

Summit Series
The 1998 World Ringette Championships were replaced by a Summit Series between Team Canada and Team Finland, both of which were senior teams. Team Canada finished in second place while Team Finland finished in first.

Senior Canada

Junior Canada

Team Canada Senior
Canada's first appearance in international ringette took place at the first World Ringette Championships in 1990 with six different Canadian senior amateur ringette teams representing the country: Team Alberta (Calgary Debs), Team Ontario, Team Quebec, Team Manitoba, Team Saskatchewan, and Team Gloucester (host). The winners of the 1989 Western Canadian Ringette Championships, the Calgary Debs advanced to the first World Ringette Championships in 1990 as Team Alberta. The team went on to become the first to win the World Ringette Championship and the Sam Jacks Trophy. Clémence Duchesneau was named the tournament's top goalie, an award she also claimed at the next tournament.

Canada was represented by two separate teams, Team Canada East and Team Canada West, during the 1992 World Ringette Championships and the 1994 World Ringette Championships. Since the 1996 World Ringette Championships only one national Canadian team has served as the Canadian senior representative; it has won the competition twice, in 1996 and in 2002.

Team Canada Junior
Team Canada Junior first competed in the World Junior Ringette Championships. The 2009 World Junior Ringette Championships marked the first time an international competition took place specifically for junior players between ringette playing nations. The tournament was created separately from the major competition between senior national teams (the World Ringette Championships) and was established by the International Ringette Federation. 

In 2009, Canada was represented by two different Canadian junior amateur ringette teams, Team Canada East and Team Canada West. At the 2012 World Junior Ringette Championships, Canada was represented by two separate teams: Team Canada East Under-19, and Team Canada West Under-19.

The first single representative national junior ringette team in Canada was formed in 2013 after the World Junior Ringette Championships tournament merged with the larger World Ringette Championships and a Junior division was created.

Due to the Covid-19 pandemic, the 2021 World Ringette Championships were cancelled and therefore there was no Team Canada Junior for that year.

Medal record

Senior medal record
In conjunction with a gold medal, the winning senior national ringette team is awarded the Sam Jacks Trophy which was first introduced at the world inaugural World Ringette Championships (WRC) in 1990 in Gloucester, Ontario, Canada. A new redesign of the Sam Jacks Trophy was introduced during the 1996 World Ringette Championships in Stockholm, Sweden. 1996 was the year Canada sent the first all–Canadian national ringette team to the WRC whereas before Canada had sent regional teams.

Junior medal record
In conjunction with a gold medal, the winning junior national ringette team is awarded the Juuso Wahlsten Trophy which was first introduced during the 2019 World Ringette Championships (WRC) in Burnaby, Canada. 2013 was the year Canada sent the first all–Canadian junior national ringette team to the WRC whereas before Canada had sent regional teams to the World Junior Ringette Championships (WJRC) in 2009 and 2012, after which the tournament merged with the WRC.

Notable people

Players
Keely Brown (goaltender)
Julie Blanchette

 Shelly Hruska
Erin Cumpstone

Samuel Perry Jacks
Samuel Perry Jacks, commonly known as Sam Jacks, is the Canadian who created the sport of ringette. Ringette's preeminent international award for ringette athletes, the World Ringette Championships, Sam Jacks Trophy, is awarded to the winning team in the Senior Pool and is named in his honour.

Mirl Arthur McCarthy
Mirl Arthur McCarthy, commonly known as "Red", was the Canadian responsible for designing ringette's first set of official rules.

Gallery

See also

Ringette
Ringette in Canada
World Ringette Championships
  Finland national ringette team
  United States national ringette team
  Sweden national ringette team
  Czech Republic national ringette team
International Ringette Federation
Sam Jacks
Juhani "Juuso" Wahlsten
National Ringette League

References

External links
 International Ringette Federation
 The History of Ringette in Calgary
  Ringette Canada
    Ringette Finland
   Team USA Ringette
    Sweden Ringette Association
   Ringette Slovakia
   Czech Ringette

Ringette
National ringette teams
Ringette
Ringette
Ringette players
Canadian sportswomen